The Ashaway River is a river in the U.S. states of Rhode Island and Connecticut. It flows approximately 4 km (2 mi). There are three dams along the river's length.

Course 
The river is formed in Hopkinton by the confluence of Parmenter Brook and the Green Fall River, about 500 feet north of Interstate 95, and just a few feet east of the Connecticut state line. From there, it flows south-southwest, briefly entering North Stonington, Connecticut for about 500 feet, before turning southeast and crossing back into Rhode Island and continuing through Hopkinton to its mouth at the Pawcatuck River.

Crossings 
Below is a list of all crossings over the Ashaway River. The list starts at the headwaters and goes downstream.
Hopkinton
Interstate 95
Wellstown Road
High Street (RI 216)
Laurel Street

Tributaries 
The Ashaway River has no named tributaries, though it has many unnamed streams that feed it.

See also 
List of rivers in Rhode Island

References 

Maps from the United States Geological Survey

Rivers of Washington County, Rhode Island
Hopkinton, Rhode Island
Rivers of Rhode Island
Tributaries of Pawcatuck River
Wild and Scenic Rivers of the United States